Chic is the debut album by Chic, released on Atlantic Records in 1977. The cover art featured two models, Valentine Monnier (left) and Alva Chinn (right), uncredited in a photograph taken by Frank Laffitte.

Release 

It includes the hit singles "Dance, Dance, Dance (Yowsah, Yowsah, Yowsah)" - originally released on Buddah Records - (US Hot 100 #6, R&B #6, US Club Play #1, UK #6)  and "Everybody Dance" (US Hot 100 #38, R&B #12, US Club Play #1, UK #9). Chic's debut album reached #27 on the US Pop charts, #12 on the R&B charts and was certified Gold by the RIAA, selling more than half a million copies.

Chic was released on compact disc by Atlantic Records/Warner Music in 1991. The album was digitally remastered and re-issued by Wounded Bird Records in 2006 and by Warner Music Japan in 2011.

Track listing
All tracks written by Bernard Edwards and Nile Rodgers, except "Dance, Dance, Dance (Yowsah, Yowsah, Yowsah)" and "São Paulo" by Edwards, Kenny Lehman, and Rodgers; all tracks produced by Edwards, Lehman, and Rodgers.

Personnel
Norma Jean Wright - Lead vocals (B1, B2, B3)
Bernard Edwards - Lead vocals (A3), bass guitar
Nile Rodgers - guitar, vocals
Tony Thompson - drums
Luther Vandross - vocals
 Alfa Anderson - vocals
 David Lasley - vocals
 Robin Clark - vocals
 Diva Gray  - vocals
 Kenny Lehman - woodwinds
 David Friedman - orchestral bells, vibraphones
 Raymond Jones - keyboards
 Robert Sabino - keyboards
 Andy Schwartz - keyboards
 Tom Coppola - keyboards
 Jeremy Wall - keyboards
 George Young - flute, tenor saxophone
 Vito Rendace - flute, tenor saxophone on "Dance, Dance, Dance (Yowsah, Yowsah, Yowsah)"
 Jon Faddis - trumpet
 Jay Beckenstein - saxophone on Sao Paulo
 Barry Rogers - trombone
 Gerardo Velez - percussion
 Sammy Figueroa - percussion
 Alfred Brown - strings contractor
 Gloria Agostini - harp
 Bernard Edwards, Nile Rodgers, Kenny Lehman - arrangements

Production
 Bernard Edwards - record producer
 Nile Rodgers - producer
 Kenny Lehman - co-producer (track B1)
 Bob Clearmountain - sound engineer
 Bob Drake - engineer
 Michael Frondelli - engineer
 Ron Johnsen - engineer
Tom Savarese - engineer
Marc Kreiner, Tom Cossie - executive producers
Bob Defrin - art direction
Lynn Dresse Breslin - design
 Recorded at Electric Lady Studios, New York; vocals and mixed at Power Station, New York

Charts

Weekly charts

Year-end charts

Certifications and sales

References

Chic (band) albums
1977 debut albums
Atlantic Records albums
Albums produced by Nile Rodgers
Albums produced by Bernard Edwards
Albums recorded at Electric Lady Studios